Euaeon of Lampsacus was one of Plato's students.

References
Diogenes Laërtius, Life of Plato. Translated by C.D. Yonge.

4th-century BC Greek people
Academic philosophers
4th-century BC philosophers
Students of Plato